Haymaker may refer to:

Sports
 Troy Haymakers, a name used by several professional baseball clubs
 Lincoln Haymakers, a 2004–2014 indoor football team based in Lincoln, Nebraska, U.S.
 The sports teams of the former Phillips University, Enid, Oklahoma, U.S.
 Pennsylvania Haymakers, a 2011–2012 American indoor lacrosse team, Pennsylvania, U.S.
 Mansfield Haymakers, the 1897–1900 name of the Mansfield Pioneers

Other uses
 Conditioner (farming), a type of farm machine that treats hay to cause more rapid and even drying
 Haymaker (album), a 2003 album by the American metal band Throwdown
 Haymaker (band), a Canadian country rock band
 Haymaker Hall, a residence hall at Kansas State University, Manhattan, Kansas, U.S.
 Panaeolina foenisecii or Haymaker, a common species of mushroom
 A type of boxing punch, a wild swing with all of a person's might to knock out the opponent
 David Haye (born 1980), a British boxing world champion nicknamed "The Hayemaker," after the punch
 John Haymaker, early American settler in Ohio regarded as the founder of Kent, Ohio, U.S.